Yakutpura Assembly constituency is a constituency of Telangana Legislative Assembly, India. It is one of 17 constituencies in Capital city of Hyderabad. It is part of Hyderabad Lok Sabha constituency.

Syed Ahmed Pasha Quadri of All India Majlis-e-Ittehadul Muslimeen is representing the constituency from 2018.

Extent of the constituency
The Assembly Constituency presently comprises the following neighbourhoods:

Members of Legislative Assembly Begum Bazar

Members of Legislative Assembly Yakutpura

Election results

Telangana Legislative Assembly election, 2018

Telangana Legislative Assembly election, 2014

References

http://myneta.info/telangana2014/candidate.php?candidate_id=438

See also
 Yakutpura
 List of constituencies of Telangana Legislative Assembly

Assembly constituencies of Telangana
Hyderabad district, India
Constituencies established in 1957
1957 establishments in Andhra Pradesh